Gannavaram could refer to one of the following constituencies of the Andhra Pradesh Legislative Assembly:

 Gannavaram, Krishna Assembly constituency, in Krishna district
 Gannavaram, Konaseema Assembly constituency, in Konaseema district